Jack McBain (born January 6, 2000) is a Canadian professional ice hockey player for Arizona Coyotes of the National Hockey League (NHL). He was drafted 63rd overall by the Minnesota Wild in the 2018 NHL Entry Draft.

Playing career
McBain was drafted 63rd overall by the Minnesota Wild in the 2018 NHL Entry Draft. After the draft, he committed to Boston College and played with them for four seasons.

Following the completion of McBain's senior season with the Eagles and the conclusion of his collegiate career, McBain informed the Wild that he did not intend to sign a contract with the club. Faced with the prospect of losing McBain's rights for nothing, as graduating collegiate players become unrestricted free agents in August annually, and with multiple NHL teams expressing interest in McBain's services, the Wild began exploring trade opportunities for his signing rights. On March 20, 2022, McBain's NHL rights were traded by Minnesota to the Arizona Coyotes in exchange for a 2022 second-round draft pick. McBain was signed to an entry-level contract by the Coyotes a day after he was traded. McBain made his NHL debut on April 12, 2022 against the New Jersey Devils. He recorded his first point three games later, an assist on a goal by teammate Nick Ritchie, in a 9–1 loss to the Calgary Flames on April 16. On December 29, 2022, McBain recorded his first multi goal and point game, scoring two goals in a 6-3 victory against the Toronto Maple Leafs.

International play
In January 2022, McBain was selected to play for Team Canada at the 2022 Winter Olympics.

Personal life 
McBain is the son of former NHL player Andrew McBain. He grew up in The Beaches neighbourhood of Toronto.

Career statistics

International

Awards and honors

References

External links
 

2000 births
Living people
AHCA Division I men's ice hockey All-Americans
Arizona Coyotes players
Boston College Eagles men's ice hockey players
Canadian ice hockey centres
Ice hockey players at the 2022 Winter Olympics
Minnesota Wild draft picks
Olympic ice hockey players of Canada
Ice hockey people from Toronto